Eric Houghtaling (born September 5, 1954) is an American Democratic politician who represented the 11th Legislative District in the New Jersey General Assembly from 2016 to 2022, which covers portions of Monmouth County. Prior to his election to the Assembly, Houghtaling served as an elected official in Neptune Township, New Jersey.

Early life 
Houghtaling was born in Neptune Township, New Jersey. He is currently a resident of Neptune. Houghtaling works as an electrician and member of the International Brotherhood of Electrical Workers. Houghtaling and his wife, Linda, have three children and seven grandchildren. Houghtaling served on the Neptune Township Council from 2011 to 2015, and later became Mayor of Neptune Township in 2013.

New Jersey Assembly  
Houghtaling was elected to the General Assembly alongside running mate Joann Downey in November 2015, defeating Mary Pat Angelini and Caroline Casagrande. Houghtaling and Downey's victory was considered to be an unexpected upset. Houghtaling was sworn into office on January 12, 2016. Houghtaling has worked to increase public awareness of Pancreatic Cancer and introduced legislation, which was later signed into law, designating November as Pancreatic Cancer Awareness Month in New Jersey. In July 2018 Houghtaling and fellow Assemblywoman Joann Downey accused fellow Assemblywoman Serena DiMaso of violating the Truth-In-Caller ID while sending out robocalls.

In 2021, Houghtaling and Downey narrowly lost their reelection bids  in an upset to Republican candidates Marilyn Piperno and Kim Eulner.

Committees 
Agriculture and Natural Resources
Oversight, Reform and Federal Relations
Labor
Telecommunications and Utilities

Electoral history

Assembly

References 

1954 births
Living people
International Brotherhood of Electrical Workers people
Mayors of places in New Jersey
Democratic Party members of the New Jersey General Assembly
People from Neptune Township, New Jersey
Politicians from Monmouth County, New Jersey
21st-century American politicians